The 1985 Custom Credit Australian Indoor Championships was a men's tennis tournament played on indoor hard courts at the Sydney Entertainment Centre in Sydney in Australia and was part of the 1985 Nabisco Grand Prix. The tournament ran from 14 through 21 October 1985. Top-seeded Ivan Lendl won the singles title.

Finals

Singles

 Ivan Lendl defeated  Henri Leconte 6–4, 6–4, 7–6
 It was Lendl's 8th title of the year and the 55th of his career.

Doubles

 John Fitzgerald /  Anders Järryd defeated  Mark Edmondson /  Kim Warwick 6–3, 6–2
 It was Fitzgerald's 3rd title of the year and the 15th of his career. It was Järryd's 7th title of the year and the 27th of his career.

References

External links
 International Tennis Federation (ITF) – tournament edition details

 
Custom Credit Australian Indoor Championships
Australian Indoor Tennis Championships
Ind
Custom Credit Australian Indoor Championships
Sports competitions in Sydney
Tennis in New South Wales